Western Samoa at the 1990 Commonwealth Games was abbreviated SAM.

Medals

Gold
none

Silver
none

Bronze
Sililo Figota — Boxing, Men's Light Middleweight
Emerio Fainuulua — Boxing, Men's Heavyweight

References

Samoa at the Commonwealth Games
Nations at the 1990 Commonwealth Games
1990 in Samoan sport